Fréderic Marguet (Algiers, 11 June 1874 — Villeneuve-Loubet, 2 June 1951) was a French Navy officer. He was a prominent professor of navigation for students of the École navale and merchant navy, and authored a number of courses on the practice and history of maritime navigation.

Biography 
Marguet started studying at the École navale in 1891. He graduated first of his class. After serving at sea for a dozen years, he returned to the École navale  as a professor, first in naval architecture, then in astronomy and navigation. He spent the rest of his career there, first as an active duty officer, and later as a professor in residence, a status reserved for officers with special abilities. 

After reaching the age limit in 1933, with the rank of captain, Marguet remained at the École navale as a civilian archivist secretary, in fact working as a Director of studies. He retired in Paris in 1937, and later in Villeneuve-Loubet in 1940.

Marguet authored two reference textbook: Cours d'astronomie de l'École Navale and Cours de navigation et de compas. 

He also authored history books: Histoire de la longitude à la mer au XVIIIe siècle about the history of longitude, and Histoire générale de la navigation du XVe au XXe siècle.

Works

Citations

References

External links
 

École Navale alumni